Dingleberry Haze is the first EP released by American alternative rock band The Bloodhound Gang on Cheese Factory Records in November 1994.

Though there are not too many differences between this EP and their next release, Use Your Fingers, there are a few. The major difference is in the track "Coo Coo Ca Choo" which uses a sample from Cream's "Sunshine of Your Love", rather than the heavy guitar riff-laden version that appears on Use Your Fingers.

This CD was written by Jimmy Pop and Daddy Long Legs who is now in the group Wolfpac.

Track listing
All songs written by Daddy Long Legs and Jimmy Pop.

"Go Down" – 2:23
"Cheese Tidbit" – 0:44
"Legend In My Spare Time" – 3:08
"Neighbour Invasion" – 0:07
"Mama Say" – 3:02
"Rang Dang" – 3:04
"Earlameyer The Butt Pirate" – 0:06
"One Way" – 3:07
"Shitty Record Offer" – 0:51
"Coo Coo Ca Choo" – 2:40
"Live At The Apollo" – 2:10

Unreleased tracks 
The group was planning on putting more tracks on this EP, but it has been said that they decided against it due to time constraints. Some of these tracks have been released on the band's first album, Use Your Fingers, although they were re-recorded.
 Convoy
 Hokie Pokie (though it leaked on the internet in 2011)
 Ornamental Groove in Floopoid Zee (One of the band's earliest songs)
 No Rest for the Wicked
 We Are the Knuckleheads
 She Ain't Got No Legs

Alternative versions of a few of the songs on this EP are also circulating among fans.

Personnel
Engineer – Bill Fitch, D.J. Mizz, Michael Harmon, Richie Gaglia
Executive Producer – Cousin Mike
Mastered By – Gene Paul
Other [Cover Model] – Grover
Performer – Daddy Long Legs, Jimmy Pop
Performer [The Rest Of The Gang] – Bubba K. Love, Foof, Lazy I, M.S.G. (2), Skip O-Pot 2 Mus*, White Steve
Photography – Nicole Shore
Written-By – Daddy Long Legs, Jimmy Pop

References

1994 debut EPs
Bloodhound Gang albums
Cheese Factory Records EPs